The Pakistan Business Council (PBC) is a business policy advocacy platform, established in 2005 by 14 of Pakistan's (now 68) largest private-sector businesses / conglomerates, including multinationals. It is a professionally run organization headed by a full-time chief executive officer and Company Secretary. The current CEO is Mr. Ehsan Malik, who brings with him considerable experience of working in the corporate sector and with the government, and the company secretary is  Mustafa Kamal Zuberi.

The PBC is a not-for-profit entity, registered under Section 42 of the Companies Ordinance 1984. Though it is not required under the law to do so, the PBC follows to the extent possible, the Code of Corporate Governance as applicable to listed companies.

Objectives of the PBC:

The major objectives of the PBC as stated in its founding documents are:

 To provide for the formation and exchange of views on any question connected with the conduct of businesses in and from Pakistan.
 To conduct, organize, set up, administer and manage campaigns, surveys, focus groups, workshops, seminars and field works for carrying out research and raising awareness in regard to matters affecting domestic businesses in Pakistan.
 To acquire, collect, compile, analyze, publish and provide statistics, data analysis and other information relating to businesses of any kind, nature or description and on opportunities for such businesses within and outside Pakistan.
 To promote and facilitate the integration of businesses in Pakistan into the World economy and to encourage the development and growth of domestic Pakistani multinationals.
 To interact with Governments in the economic development of Pakistan and to facilitate, foster and further the economic, social and human resource development of Pakistan.
 To promote a "Make in Pakistan" policy, the Pakistan Business Council occasionally urges the government to address the fragmented and often conflicting policies of federal ministries and provinces regarding the domestic industry and exports. It also highlights the need for domestic industries to be aware of global competition.

Board of directors
The PBC Board has 15 members, fourteen of whom are elected from the Executive Members of the PBC while the CEO is the 15th member of the Board. The current composition of the PBC Board is as follows:

Composition by sectors of the economy 
PBC currently has 36 members, who cover nearly all sectors of the formal economy. Sector wise representation is as follows:

Membership profile

Former chief executives
Syed Salim Raza (2009)
 Kamran Mirza

Future plans
In June 2019, Federal Minister for Planning, Development and Reforms, Khusro Bakhtiar stated that the government was considering to form a Pak-China Business Council to promote Pakistan's private sector role in China-Pakistan Economic Corridor (CPEC) – an ongoing mega-project between Pakistan and China.

References

External links 
 Pakistan Business Council Website

Pakistani lobbyists
Business organisations based in Pakistan
2005 establishments in Pakistan